Rahim Rahmanzadeh (born 13 June 1934 in Shabestar, East Azerbaijan) is an Iranian-German academic, physician and surgeon at the University of Berlin and University of Mainz. Rahmanzadeh is president of the International Center for Bone and Joint Surgery in Berlin.

References

External links
 Gelenkzentrum.de
 Tagesspiegel.de

Iranian orthopedic surgeons
German people of Azerbaijani descent
German people of Iranian descent
Istanbul University alumni
Alborz High School alumni
20th-century Iranian physicians
People from Shabestar
1934 births
Living people
Officers Crosses of the Order of Merit of the Federal Republic of Germany
German people of Iranian Azerbaijani descent
20th-century surgeons